Kisar is a Central Malayo-Polynesian language spoken on Kisar Island, northeast of East Timor in Maluku, Indonesia. It shares the island with Oirata, which is a Papuan language.

References

Further reading
 Taber, Mark (1993). "Toward a Better Understanding of the Indigenous Languages of Southwestern Maluku." Oceanic Linguistics, Vol. 32, No. 2 (Winter, 1993), pp. 389–441. University of Hawai'i.

Timor–Babar languages
Languages of Indonesia